The Little Mashel River is a river in Pierce County, Washington. It is noted for its canyon and the three waterfalls.

Course 
There, the river briefly turns southwest, picks up the waters of its only named tributary, Midway Creek, and then turns northwest again. It flows that way for another  or so until its confluence with the Mashel.

South Fork 

See also
Little Mashel River Waterfalls
List of rivers in Washington

References

External links

Rivers of Washington (state)
Rivers of Pierce County, Washington